Ebligen railway station is a Swiss railway station near the settlement of Ebligen in the municipality of Oberried am Brienzersee and the canton of Bern. Ebligen is a stop on the Brünig line, owned by the Zentralbahn, that operates between Interlaken and Lucerne.

Services 
The following services stop at Ebligen:

References

External links 
 
 

Railway stations in the canton of Bern
Oberried am Brienzersee
Zentralbahn stations